The 2004–05 international cricket season was from September 2004 to April 2005. There were no major tournaments played during this time. The season included the first-ever Twenty20 International match.

Season overview

Pre-season rankings

September

Paktel Cup

October

Australia in India

New Zealand in Bangladesh

Sri Lanka in Pakistan

November

BCCI Platinum Jubilee Match

New Zealand in Australia

South Africa In India

England in Zimbabwe

December

India in Bangladesh

Pakistan in Australia

England in South Africa

Sri Lanka in New Zealand

The second to fifth ODIs were cancelled to allow the Sri Lankan team to return home following the 2004 Indian Ocean earthquake and tsunami on 26 December.

January

Zimbabwe in Bangladesh

World Cricket Tsunami Appeal

VB Series

February

Australia in New Zealand

Zimbabwe in South Africa

March

Pakistan in India

South Africa in the West Indies

References

External links
2004/05 season on ESPN Cricinfo

2004 in cricket
2005 in cricket